This page details the qualifying process for the 1990 African Cup of Nations in Algeria. Algeria, as hosts, and Cameroon, as title holders, qualified automatically.

Qualifying Tournament
 qualified as hosts
 qualified as holders

Preliminary round

|}

Swaziland won 3–1 on penalty shootout after 2–2 on aggregate.

Angola won 4–1 on aggregate.

Mali won 4–1 on aggregate.

Mauritius won 3–1 on aggregate.

Gabon won 3–1 on aggregate.

Ethiopia advanced after Uganda withdrew.

Guinea advanced after Gambia withdrew.

Libya advanced after Mauritania withdrew.

Mozambique advanced after Madagascar withdrew.

First round

|}

Kenya won 6–5 on penalty shootout after 1–1 on aggregate.

Egypt won 6–2 on aggregate.

Nigeria won 4–1 on aggregate.

Gabon won 5–3 on penalty shootout after 1–1 on aggregate.

Mali won by away goals rule after 1–1 on aggregate.

Ivory Coast won 6–1 on aggregate.

Malawi won 3–1 on aggregate.

Zimbabwe won 5–1 on aggregate.

Zambia won 4–0 on aggregate.

Senegal advanced after Togo withdrew.

Tunisia advanced after Libya withdrew.

Zaire advanced after Sierra Leone withdrew.

Second round

|}

Senegal won 4–0 on aggregate.

Kenya won 3–2 on aggregate.

Egypt won 2–0 on aggregate.

Nigeria won 4–1 on aggregate.

Ivory Coast won 5–3 on aggregate.

Zambia won 4–2 on aggregate.

Qualified teams

References

External links
 African Nations Cup 1990 details - rsssf.com

Qual
Qual
Africa Cup of Nations qualification
1990 African Cup of Nations